The goal of a communication-enabled business process (CEBP) is to optimize business process by reducing the human latency that exists within a process flow. For example, a mortgage approval process may be experiencing human latency because the person assigned to providing an approval is on vacation or busy working on something else. To reduce this latency, CEBP leverages unified communications  capabilities (i.e. UC services) by embedding them into the business process flow. The result is a more efficient, more automated closed-loop process; translating into significant ROI.

If the person does not provide the necessary approval within a designated period of time then the business process would invoke a UC service such as “notify and respond” from an IP PBX, voice portal/IVR, conferencing application, etc. These embedded UC services would “notify” the person that they need to do something. If the person does not “respond” to the notification then it can be escalated to a manager in the same manner.

Etymology 
The term "CEBP" was coined by Gartner in 2003. Their description of the term can be summarized as "integrating communications and collaboration with business processes".

Types of services
In fact, there are a number of UC services that could be embedded within a business process to reduce human latency. These could include: conference [on demand], alert, escalate, contact resident expert, etc.; all of which create measurable business value.

Advantages
The great thing about CEBP is that it can be applied horizontally across different lines of business and different industries. Virtually every business process is hampered by human latency. Some other use cases that CEBP can be applied to include: roadside assistance, stock portfolio alerts, personal information loss, claims processing, inventory management, etc. Here is a more detailed example:

CEBP example
In claims processing, the organization's goal is to decrease claim close times and improve their closure rate. However, this process is often hampered by several inefficiencies – the paperwork process can be manually intensive; time-sensitive dependencies on member signatures exist, resulting in significant delays in the approval process.

A CEBP solution would be implemented to automate and communications-enable the claims process with embedded UC services like: reminders, alerts, and notifications.

Quantifiable business results could include: decreased close times; greater agent/specialist productivity, enabling them to spend more time adjusting claims rather than fielding calls on the claims; increased revenue and member satisfaction/retention.

CEBP versus unified communications 
Many UC vendors claim that they do CEBP today. However, one very important distinction needs to be made: there is a difference between communications integrated into business process and communications enabled business process.

It is person triggered as illustrated in examples like adding a click-to-dial function to an ERP or CRM application. As described above, CEBP is much more sophisticated in its ability to automate business process flows; it is usually event triggered, providing a much stronger ROI to many lines of business and vertical industries.

Notes

Business process